Austropyrgus eumekes is a species of minute freshwater snail with an operculum, an aquatic gastropod mollusc or micromollusc in the Hydrobiidae family. This species is endemic to western Victoria, Australia.  It is only known from several locations on Darlot Creek, a tributary of the Fitzroy River.

See also 
 List of non-marine molluscs of Australia

References

Further reading

External links

Hydrobiidae
Austropyrgus
Endemic fauna of Australia
Gastropods of Australia
Gastropods described in 2003